The murder of Cheri Jo Bates occurred in Riverside, California, on October 30, 1966. Bates, an 18-year-old college freshman, was stabbed and slashed to death on the grounds of Riverside City College. Police determined the assailant had disabled the ignition coil wire and distributor of Bates' Volkswagen Beetle as a method to lure her from her car as she studied in the college library. The murder itself remains one of Riverside's most infamous cold cases, and has been described by some locals as a murder which "stripped Riverside of its innocence".

Bates' murder was highly publicized due to both its graphically violent nature, and the fact she is considered by some investigators to have been the first murder victim of the Zodiac Killer, although this theory has never been definitively confirmed.

Early life
Cheri Josephine Bates was born in Omaha, Nebraska, on February 4, 1948. She was the younger of two children born to Joseph and Irene (née Karolevitz) Bates. The Bates family relocated to California in 1957, where her father found employment as a machinist at the Corona Naval Ordnance Laboratory. Bates was a graduate of Ramona High School, where she had been a varsity cheerleader active in the student government, and an honor student. Described as a "sweet, outgoing girl" by acquaintances, she held aspirations to become a flight attendant.

Following her graduation from Ramona High School, Bates enrolled at the Riverside City College (RCC) and found part-time employment at the Riverside National Bank. Her savings, plus wages from this part-time employment, helped pay for a 1960 lime green Volkswagen Beetle, a vehicle she was proud to own. Bates lived alone with her father at 4195 Via San Jose, her parents having divorced in 1965. Her mother also lived in Riverside, and her older brother, Michael Bates, served in the United States Navy.

Murder
On the morning of October 30, 1966, Bates and her father attended Mass at the St. Catherine of Alexandria Catholic Church before the two shared breakfast at a local restaurant. In the early afternoon, Bates opted to visit the college library to both study and to work on a research paper. She is known to have twice phoned a close friend named Stephanie Guttman (at 3:00 and 3:45 p.m. respectively), asking whether she would like to accompany her to the library to study and retrieve books, although on the occasion of the second phone call, her friend refused. Bates is believed to have left her house to visit the library sometime between 4:30 and 5:00 p.m. Her father returned home in the evening to find a note taped to the family refrigerator reading: "Dad—Went to RCC Library."

Shortly before Bates left her home, she phoned a co-worker at the Riverside National Bank inquiring as to whether she had seen a term paper bibliography she (Bates) had misplaced. When her co-worker replied she had not, Bates replied: "Now I'll have to start all over on my note cards." A subsequent eyewitness report given to Riverside investigators indicated Bates drove her Beetle in the direction of RCC at approximately 6:10 p.m. This eyewitness also claimed her vehicle was closely followed by a bronze 1965 or 1966 model Oldsmobile.

According to many eyewitnesses, Bates studied in the library until the normal closing time of 9:00 p.m. Although this witness did not know the individual lurking within shaded areas aside the street, as she passed him the two had exchanged brief pleasantries.

Bates' father waited the entire night for his only daughter to return home before filing a missing person report with Riverside Police Department (RPD) at 5:43 a.m. He filed this report after phoning Guttman in the early morning hours, only to be informed that his daughter was not at her residence and had intended to study at the RCC library the previous evening, having held no plans to spend the evening away from home. At approximately 6:28 a.m. on the morning of October 31, a groundskeeper named Cleophus Martin discovered Bates' body on the grounds of RCC.

Investigation
Bates was found sprawled face down on a gravel path between two unoccupied houses on Terracina Drive, close to the library parking lot where she had parked her Beetle the previous evening. She was still dressed in a long-sleeve pale yellow print blouse and faded red capri pants and her woven straw bag—containing both her identification and 56 cents—lay alongside her body. Her clothing was undisturbed but was saturated in blood. She had been repeatedly stabbed in the chest and left shoulder, and suffered several deep slash wounds to her face and neck.

Ten feet from Bates' body, investigators discovered a cheap, paint-spattered Timex brand wristwatch with a seven-inch circumference along with a footprint of a shoe produced by Leavenworth prisoners sold solely in military outlets. The shoe size was between eight and ten inches. Although only  in height, Bates had been an athletic woman. Both an examination of the crime scene and Bates' subsequent autopsy revealed ample evidence of a ferocious physical struggle between Bates and her murderer; she having evidently scratched her assailant's arms, face and head and torn off his wristwatch.

Bates' Beetle was parked just 75 yards east of the location where her body was discovered. The ignition wiring of the vehicle had been deliberately pulled loose, but the ignition key was in place and both the driver's side and passenger windows were rolled partly down. Three library books on the subject of United States government were lying on the front seat, and several smeared, greasy palm prints and fingerprints were found upon the vehicle. Investigators would determine these prints did not belong to Bates or any of her friends or relatives, and believe they may have belonged to her murderer.

Autopsy
An autopsy revealed Bates had been repeatedly kicked in the head in addition to having received two stab wounds to her chest, inflicted by a knife estimated to be one-and-a-half-inches wide and three-and-a-half-inches in length. Her left cheek, upper lip, hands and arms had also been cut, with three slash wounds to her throat having severed her jugular vein and larynx and almost decapitating her. Bates had evidently lain upon the ground when she had received the knife wounds to her left shoulder blade and neck. Furthermore, she had not been subjected to any form of sexual assault or robbery within this attack. Numerous fragments of skin and brown hair were also recovered from beneath the fingernails of her right hand; this evidence having evidently been collected beneath her nails as she clawed at her assailant in a desperate effort to defend herself. The ground surrounding her body was described in her official autopsy report as "looking like a freshly plowed field."

On November 4, 1966, Bates was laid to rest at the Crestlawn Memorial Park in Riverside. Her parents, older brother and several hundred other mourners were present at this service.

Murder scenario
Within 24 hours of Bates' murder, investigators had interviewed 75 individuals, including numerous RCC students, and had begun interviewing military personnel stationed at the nearby March Air Force Base. By November 6, all but two of the individuals known to have been on the RCC campus had been traced and eliminated from the inquiry. Investigators also received testimony from two separate individuals who had heard brief female screams emanating from the direction of Terracina Drive on the evening of the murder. From this, plus the conclusion of the coroner, investigators determined Bates had most likely been murdered at approximately 10:15 p.m. Investigations into her background could deduce no obvious motive for the killing, and revealed nothing which could classify her as an obvious or typical target for any form of revenge or random non-sexual violence.

Investigators theorized Bates' murderer had likely disabled her vehicle before waiting for her to return from her studying within the college library on the night of her murder; they also believe the perpetrator likely surprised Bates after she had repeatedly attempted to start her car, before offering her assistance as an initial ruse to lure her from her vehicle before proceeding to attack her within a dimly lit section of Terracina Drive partly shielded from the view of potential witnesses by domestic shrubbery. At the time of discovery, both windows of Bates' Beetle were rolled down and the keys of her vehicle were still in the ignition, thus meaning she had likely been forced from her vehicle to the scene of her murder while she stood aside or sat inside her vehicle.

At the initiative of RPD Detective Sergeant David Bonine, a staged re-enactment of Bates' final hours studying within the RCC library was conducted nine days after her funeral in the hope of producing vital eyewitnesses. Present at this re-enactment were 62 students, two librarians, and one custodian who had actually been in the library on the evening of October 30; all of whom sat or stood where they had actually been on the evening in question. All participants who owned a vehicle were asked to park their car in precisely the same spot it had been on the evening of the murder, and all participants wore the same clothing they had on the evening in question. This initiative did bring forward numerous eyewitnesses, although no fruitful leads were gained. Nonetheless, several individuals stated they had seen a tan-gray Studebaker in the close vicinity of the RCC campus on the evening of October 30. Despite extensive appeals by both investigators and the local press, the owner of this vehicle was never traced.

Correspondence

One month after Bates' murder, two identical type-written letters arrived at RPD headquarters and the editorial offices of the Riverside Press-Enterprise. The author of these letters described a likely scenario as to how Bates had been lured from her vehicle and subsequently murdered. This author described in detail how he had first disabled Bates' car before allegedly watching her repeatedly attempt to switch on the ignition until the vehicle battery had drained of power. He had then offered her assistance, claiming his own vehicle was further down the street; thus luring her away from her vehicle. According to the author of this letter, after the two had walked a short distance from her car, he had stated to her, "It's about time." Bates had replied, "About time for what?" to which he had simply replied, "About time for you to die." According to the author, he had then clasped his hand over her mouth and pressed a knife against her neck before forcing her to walk to a dimly lit alley where he had proceeded to beat and kick Bates in their initial struggle before stabbing and slashing her to death.

The author of these letters claimed to have known his victim, proclaiming: "Only one thing was on my mind: Making her pay for the brush-offs that she had given me during the years prior." Due to the fact the letter included details of the murder which had not been released to the press—including the fact the ignition coil and middle wire of the distributor of Bates' vehicle had been disabled—investigators initially believed that the author of the letter may have been the actual murderer.

On April 30, 1967, The Press-Enterprise printed a further update on Bates' murder. The following day, both the RPD and Bates' father received handwritten letters from an unknown individual, who had scrawled the message, "Bates had to die. There will be more" on a single sheet of paper. This letter was also considered by police to have been a distasteful hoax, although at the bottom of each letter was an indecipherable number or letter which was either a "2" or a "Z".

Potential link to Zodiac Killer

It has been hypothesized that Bates may have been an early victim—perhaps the first victim—of an unidentified serial killer active in Northern California from the late 1960s to the early 1970s known as the Zodiac Killer, and that this unidentified individual may have originated from Riverside and later moved to the San Francisco Bay Area. One of the potential clues supporting this theory was the discovery of a set of lower case initials (r h) inscribed below a macabre poem scratched into a desk at RCC. This poem was discovered by a custodian six months after Bates' murder and contains graphic references to repeated assaults upon young women with a bladed weapon. The desk in question was in the college storage area at the time the poem was discovered, although the custodian informed police the desk had been on the library floor at the time of Bates' murder. Police photographed the inscription and added this piece of circumstantial evidence to the case file.

Furthermore, the fact that the perpetrator subsequently sent correspondence to the police and press, including details of the murder withheld from the public, is reminiscent of the Zodiac Killer. In addition, the RPD have also noted similarities between Bates' slaying and the general modus operandi of a fatal attack upon a young couple committed at Lake Berryessa in September 1969—an attack conclusively ascribed to the Zodiac Killer.

San Francisco Chronicle journalist Paul Avery followed the Zodiac murders from the date of the perpetrator's first definite killings. In November 1970, Avery received a letter from an anonymous source informing him of the similarities between the murders committed by the Zodiac and the murder of Bates four years previously. The letter urged Avery to investigate the similarities in greater detail. Although the RPD remained unconvinced of his conclusions, both Avery and a handwriting expert named Sherwood Morrill stated on November 16 that the handwriting scratched on the desk at RCC and the letters sent to The Press-Enterprise and Bates' father in 1967 were "unquestionably" written by the same individual who had later written the Zodiac letters. By this date, the Zodiac claimed to have killed fourteen victims, although only five murders and two attempted murders committed between December 1968 and October 1969 have ever been conclusively attributed to this individual.

In a letter dated March 13, 1971, the Zodiac Killer claimed to the Los Angeles Times that he was responsible for the murder of Bates, stating: "I do have to give [the police] credit for stumbling across my Riverside activity, but they are only finding the easy ones. There are a hell of a lot more down there."

Alternative theories
Former Los Angeles police investigator Steve Hodel, in his book Most Evil, has claimed that his father, George Hodel, was responsible for the murder of Bates. This claim has been viewed with little credibility, not least because—among other cases—Hodel has also claimed that his father was the Zodiac Killer, the Lipstick Killer, and the perpetrator of the 1947 murder of the Black Dahlia.

Later developments
In August 2021, the RPD's cold case unit published an update regarding the handwritten correspondence, stating that the author of the letters claiming responsibility for Bates' murder had been identified via DNA analysis in 2020, and had admitted writing the correspondence. According to the update, the author had initially—and anonymously—contacted investigators in 2016, explaining the correspondence had been a distasteful hoax. This individual expressed remorse and apologized for the hoax, saying that he had been a troubled teenager at the time and that he had written and mailed the letters as a means of seeking attention.

In October 2021, a group of retired police officers, intelligence officers and journalists claimed to have solved Bates' murder, which they claimed was linked to the Zodiac murders and that the perpetrator in both cases was a man named Gary Francis Poste. Among the evidence cited as the basis for their claims was the fact that Poste was a painter by profession, which would explain the paint-spattering upon the Timex watch found at the crime scene; that Poste was receiving medical treatment at March Air Force Base for an "accidental" gunshot wound at around the time of Bates' death; that this location was fifteen minutes from the site of Bates' murder; and that Poste had brown hair, which could be a match for that found under Bates' fingernails.

This theory was met with skepticism from the RPD. According to the online newspaper TMZ, the group claimed the RPD had refused their requests to submit samples of the hair found beneath Bates' fingernails to DNA testing; however, the RPD has denied any such request has been received. The RPD maintain that there is no evidence linking Bates killing to the later Zodiac murders and that they strongly believe her murderer was native to Riverside County.

Aftermath
Officially, Bates' murder remains an unsolved case, and the theory she was a victim of the Zodiac Killer (which has been strongly disputed by the RPD) has never been proven. Despite several suspects having been investigated and eliminated from the inquiry since 1966, the current investigator assigned to the case, Detective Jim Simons, has stated one individual still remains of interest to the investigation, although because tests conducted upon the mitochondrial DNA of the hair and blood samples found at the crime scene did not match those of this suspect, insufficient physical evidence exists to link this individual to the crime. Investigators who conducted DNA profiling were, however, able to determine that her murderer was a Caucasian male.

Following the murder, Bates' family established a memorial scholarship at RCC. This scholarship, entitled The Cheri Jo Bates Memorial Endowed Scholarship, is awarded to a student active in various school projects and initiatives, who demonstrates financial needs, undertakes volunteer work, and who majors in music with at least a B grade average.

Bates' mother, Irene, died of strychnine poisoning in early July 1969.

See also
 Cold case
 Crime in California
 List of unsolved murders

Notes

References

Cited works and further reading

External links
 Contemporary news article pertaining to the murder of Cheri Jo Bates
 1976 Fort Scott Tribune news article detailing the murder of Bates
 Information pertaining to the murder of Bates at zodiackiller.com
 SF Weekly news article detailing ongoing efforts to identify Bates' murderer
 The macabre poem found inscribed upon a desk which had been in the Riverside Community College on the night Bates was murdered

1966 in California
1966 murders in the United States
October 1966 events in the United States
Deaths by person in California
Deaths by stabbing in California
History of women in California
Murder in Riverside County, California
Female murder victims
People murdered in California
Unsolved murders in the United States
Violence against women in the United States